Oliver Schmitz (born 1960) is a South African film director and screenwriter. 

His film Mapantsula was screened in the Un Certain Regard section at the 1988 Cannes Film Festival. His 2010 film Life, Above All was also screened in the Un Certain Regard section at the 2010 Cannes Film Festival and it was selected as the South African entry for the Best Foreign Language Film at the 83rd Academy Awards. It made the shortlist of nominations announced in January 2011.

Selected filmography
 Mapantsula (1988)
 Hijack Stories (2000)
 Paris, je t'aime (2006)
  (2007)
 Deadly Harvest (2008)
 Life, Above All (2010)
 Shepherds and Butchers (2016)

Awards
 Black Reel Awards 2012 Nominated
 Black Reel Outstanding Foreign Film
 Dubai International Film Festival 2010 Won
 Durban International Film Festival 2010 Won  Best South African Film
 Muhr AsiaAfrica Special Jury Prize	 Feature Oliver Schmitz  Nominated
 Muhr AsiaAfrica Award, Best Film - Feature Oliver Schmitz 
 Image Awards 2012 Nominated Image Award	 Outstanding Foreign Motion Picture
 Leo Awards 2011 Won Leo	 Best Screenwriting in a Feature Length DramaDennis Foon 
 National Board of Review, USA 2010 Won NBR Award	 Top Five Foreign Films

References

External links

1960 births
Living people
South African film directors
South African screenwriters
Writers from Cape Town